The Petroleum Act 1871 (34 &  35 Vict. c. 105) is an Act of the Parliament of the United Kingdom to regulate the storage and transport of petroleum and similar substances.

Background 
The storage and transport of petroleum and petroleum products had been controlled by the Petroleum Acts 1862 to 1868. By 1871 the provisions of these Acts required to be updated; the 1871 Act was intended to enact these requirements. The Petroleum Act 1862 and the Petroleum Act 1868 were wholly repealed by the 1871 Act.

Petroleum Act 1871 
The Petroleum Act 1871 (34 & 35 Vict. c. 105) received royal assent on 21 August 1871. Its long title is 'An Act for the safe keeping of petroleum and other substances of a like nature'.

Provisions 
The Act comprises 18 sections and two schedules:

 Section 1. Short title of Act
 Section 2. Interpretation of certain terms in the Act
 Section 3. Definition of Petroleum and application of Act
 Section 4. Bye-laws as to ship carrying petroleum
 Section 5. Notice by owner or master of ship carrying petroleum
 Section 6. Label on vessels containing petroleum
 Section 7. Regulations as to storage of petroleum
 Section 8. Definition of local authority
 Section 9. Mode of granting licenses
 Section 10. In case of refusal of licence
 Section 11. Testing of petroleum by officer of local authority
 Section 12. Penalty for refusing information and obstructing officer
 Section 13. Search for petroleum
 Section 14. Application of Act to other substances
 Section 15. Summary proceedings for offences, penalties &c.
 Section 16. Reservation of previous powers with respect to inflammable substances
 Section 17. Repeal of Acts
 Section 18. Duration of Act (until 1 October 1872)
 Schedule 1. Replaced by Schedule 1 of 1879 Act
 Schedule 2. Repealed by Statute Law Revision Act 1883

Aftermath 
The Petroleum Act 1871 was time-limited, it expired on 1 October 1872 (1871 Act Section 18). The 1871 Act was continued by annual statutes until 1879. Section 4 of the Petroleum Act 1879 enacted that the 1871 Act shall continue in force until otherwise directed by Parliament.

The 1871 Act required harbour authorities to make by-laws regulating the trade in petroleum. The Thames Conservancy as harbour authority for the Port of London made bye-laws in 1872 which prohibited any vessel with a cargo of petroleum from proceeding above or westward of Thames Haven in Essex. Ships were required to offload cargo into covered barges for carriage into London.

The Petroleum Act 1871 was amended by the Petroleum Act 1879.

The Petroleum Acts 1871 and 1879 were still the principal Acts controlling the licensing, storage and use of petroleum and petroleum products in the late 1920s. They were both repealed by the Petroleum (Consolidation) Act 1928.

The Petroleum Act 1871 applied to Ireland and remained a statute of the Republic of Ireland until 1972 when it was repealed by the Dangerous Substances Act 1972.

See also 

 Petroleum Act

References 

History of the petroleum industry in the United Kingdom
United Kingdom Acts of Parliament 1871